Esther Charlotte Brandes (1746-May 13, 1786), was a German actress and opera singer.

She was born in Różyńsk Wielki and was the daughter of Prussian official Gottfried Salomo Kochin.

She was engaged in the Schuch theater company in 1764-68, in the Seyler Theatre Company in 1768-75, and at the Rigaer Stadttheater after its foundation.  She performed as Medea, Orsina, Minna von Barnhelm.  She became the most popular for her role of Ariadne in the duodrama "Ariadne auf Naxos" with music composed by Georg Benda (1722-1795).
She is also known to have dressed in a historical costume for this play, which was an innovation for her time in an age when actors generally did not yet dress in historically correct costumes for their roles. She was depicted in this role in a famous painting.

Esther Charlotte married Johann Christian Brandes (1735 - 1799) on 24 May 1764 in Wrocław. They had three children, notably the singer, actress, composer and pianist Minna Brandes (1765 - 1788).  The Brandes family also prepared concerts for Princess Elisabeth Christine of Brunswick-Wolfenbüttel-Bevern.

She died on May 13, 1786 in Hamburg, Germany.

References

1746 births
1786 deaths
18th-century German women opera singers
18th-century German actresses
German stage actresses